Delhi Gate is a massive arched gateway leading to Dargah Sharif, Ajmer, with pillared hall on right side which has to be used by guards. The Gateway was constructed by Mughal Emperor Akbar in 1571 AD. The Monument is under Archeological Survey of India.

References 

Buildings and structures in Ajmer
Tourist attractions in Ajmer
History of Ajmer
Gates in India
Mughal architecture